David George Taylor (born February 20, 1953 in Vancouver, B.C.) is a Canadian musician. He is best known for his work as long-serving bass player for Bryan Adams from 1982 to 1998. His auditory appearance can be heard on all of Adams' albums during that period  and he was the bassist for the touring band.

According to Bryan Adam's YouTube channel, Taylor's first concert with Adams was at the Agora Ballroom in Cleveland, Ohio, on January 6, 1982.

References

1953 births
Living people
Canadian bass guitarists
Musicians from Vancouver